KBIM-FM (94.9 MHz, "The Country Giant") is a radio station broadcasting a country music music format. Licensed to Roswell, New Mexico, United States, the station is currently owned by Noalmark Broadcasting Corporation.

Engineering
Chief Engineer is Kenneth S. Fine, CPBE

History

The station signed on in June 1959. On November 30, 2007, the station's license was assigned by King Broadcasting Company, Inc. to its current owner, Noalmark Broadcasting, along with that of its sister station KBIM.

References

External links

Country radio stations in the United States
BIM-FM
Noalmark Broadcasting Corporation radio stations
Radio stations established in 1959
1959 establishments in New Mexico